Highland Peak is a summit in the U.S. state of Nevada.

Highland Peak was named after the Scottish Highlands, the ancestral home of a pioneer citizen.

References

Mountains of Lincoln County, Nevada